The year 2006 in architecture involved some significant architectural events and new buildings.

Events
 January 9 – Fire destroys Chicago's 1891 Pilgrim Baptist Church, designed by Louis Sullivan.
 January 31 – Ground breaks on Waterview Tower, and the 89-story Shangri-La Hotel in Chicago.
 March 15 – Cirrus apartment building topped off in Helsinki, becoming the tallest building in Finland (until 2014).
 April 10 – Groundbreaking ceremony for the High Line elevated greenway in New York City.
 April 27 – Construction work begins on the Freedom Tower, a replacement for the World Trade Center.
 July 8 – The government of Abu Dhabi and Solomon R. Guggenheim Foundation signs a memorandum of understanding for the building of the Guggenheim Abu Dhabi.
 September 21 – Construction work begins on the Skolkovo Moscow School of Management campus, designed by David Adjaye.

Buildings and structures

Buildings
 February 5 – Madrid-Barajas Airport Terminal 4 inaugurated, designed by Antonio Lamela and Richard Rogers.
 March 1 – The Senedd, the National Assembly building in Cardiff, Wales, by architect Richard Rogers, is opened by Queen Elizabeth II of the United Kingdom.

 April 4 – Busch Stadium, designed by Populous (formerly HOK sport), opened as the new home of the St. Louis Cardinals.
 May 4 – Hearst Tower employees move into the Norman Foster designed, diagrid building near Columbus Circle, in New York City.
 May 5 – Aurora Tower opened to the public as the tallest building in Brisbane, Australia (until 2012).
 May 19 – Mercedes-Benz Museum, Stuttgart, Germany, designed by UNStudio, opened.
 May 23 – 7 World Trade Center officially opens the new building designed by Skidmore, Owings & Merrill at noon, with a free concert.
 May 26 – Berlin Hauptbahnhof (Berlin Main Station) opening ceremony. Design from the winning competition entry by the Hamburg architecture firm Gerkan, Marg and Partners.
 June 14 – Four Seasons Centre for the Performing Arts grand opening in Toronto, Ontario, Canada, by Canadian Diamond and Schmitt Architects.
 June 16 – The National Library of Belarus opened in Minsk, Belarus in the shape of a rhombicuboctahedron.
 June 20 – Musée du quai Branly – Jacques Chirac in Paris, designed by Jean Nouvel, inaugurated.
 June 26 – Savill Building opens at the Savill Garden in Windsor Great Park, Surrey, with a gridshell roof designed by Glen Howells Architects.
 July – Red Ribbon (bench), designed by Turenscape as part of Tanghe River Park, Qinhuangdao, China, opens.
 July 1 – Robert and Arlene Kogod Courtyard, designed by Foster and Partners opens as part of The Donald W. Reynolds Center for American Art and Portraiture refurbishment in Washington, D.C.
 July 22 – Emirates Stadium, designed by Populous, opened in the London Borough of Islington for the Arsenal Football Club.
 Summer – House of Sweden (the Swedish embassy) completed in Washington, D.C., designed by Swedish architects Gert Wingårdh and Tomas Hansen.
 September – Museum of Modern Literature (Literaturmuseum der Moderne or LiMo) opened in Marbach, Germany, by British architect David Chipperfield.
 September 2 – Bishan Community Library opened in Singapore.
 October – Janelia Farm Research Campus completed in Loudoun County, Virginia, by Rafael Viñoly.
 October 5 – The Arsht Center opens in Downtown Miami, Florida as the third largest performing arts center in the United States.
 October 11 – Eureka Tower a  residential skyscraper, designed by Fender Katsalidis Architects, opens in Melbourne, Australia.

 October 26 – Klaus Advanced Computing Building officially opened on the campus of Georgia Institute of Technology, by American architects Perkins+Will.
 October 27 – Vesteda Tower a  residential tower, designed by Jo Coenen, opens in Eindhoven, Netherlands.
 November – Maggie's Centre, Kirkcaldy, Scotland, a drop-in cancer care centre; Zaha Hadid's first built work in the United Kingdom.
 December 1
 Queensland Gallery of Modern Art, designed by Architectus, opens in Brisbane, Queensland, Australia.
 Wayne L. Morse United States Courthouse officially opened in Eugene, Oregon, designed by Morphosis.
 date unknown – America's Cup Building inaugurated in Valencia, Spain, designed by British architect David Chipperfield.

Buildings completed
 January 16 – 10 Holloway Circus is completed in Birmingham, UK, designed by SimpsonHaugh and Partners.
 October 9 – Beetham Tower in Manchester, UK, designed by architect Ian Simpson, who himself resides in the top penthouse.
 December 10 – Institute of Contemporary Art, Boston completed, designed by Diller Scofidio + Renfro.
 December – Megasport Arena in Moscow, Russia.

 date unknown
 Accordia housing development in Cambridge, UK, phase 1 construction, designed by Feilden Clegg Bradley Studios with Maccreanor Lavington and Alison Brooks Architects (Stirling Prize 2008).
 Saint-Pierre, Firminy, France, completed by José Oubrerie to a church design by Le Corbusier (died 1965) begun in 1971.
 CNOOC Building in Beijing, designed by American architects Kohn Pedersen Fox.
 KUMU (KUnstiMUuseum), Tallinn, Estonia, designed by Finnish architect Pekka Vapaavuori.
 Halmstad Library, Halmstad, Sweden, designed by Schmidt Hammer Lassen Architects.
 The New York Times Building in New York City, designed by Renzo Piano and Fox & Fowle.

Awards
 AIA Gold Medal – Antoine Predock
 Architecture Firm Award – Moore Ruble Yudell
 Carbuncle Cup – Drake Circus Shopping Centre
 Driehaus Architecture Prize – Allan Greenberg
 Emporis Skyscraper Award – Hearst Tower
 Grand Prix de l'urbanisme – Francis Cuillier
 Praemium Imperiale Architecture Award – Frei Otto
 Pritzker Prize – Paulo Mendes da Rocha (1928–2021) from São Paulo, Brasil
 Prix de l'Équerre d'Argent – Orléans-la-Source Science Library by Florence Lipsky and Pascal Rollet
 RAIA Gold Medal – Kerry Hill
 RIAS Award in Architecture – Page\Park Architects for Maggie's Centre, Inverness
 RIBA Royal Gold Medal – Toyo Ito
 Stirling Prize – Richard Rogers
 Thomas Jefferson Medal in Architecture – Peter Zumthor
 AIA Twenty-five Year Award – Thorncrown Chapel by E. Fay Jones
 Vincent Scully Prize – Phyllis Lambert

Births

Deaths
 March 9 – Harry Seidler, Austrian-born Australian architect (born 1923)
 April 25 – Jane Jacobs, American-Canadian journalist, author, and activist best known for her influence on urban studies (born 1916)
 May 10 – Nisse Strinning, Swedish architect and designer (born 1917)
 July 5 – Hugh Stubbins, US architect (born 1912)

See also
 Timeline of architecture

References

 
21st-century architecture